William Frederick Broening (1870–1953) was a Maryland politician and twice Mayor of Baltimore (1919–1923, 1927–1931).

Background 
William Frederick Broening was born in Baltimore, Maryland on 2 June 1870, the son of Henry Jacob Broening and Catherine (Petri) Broening. He graduated from the University of Maryland School of Law in 1897.

Political career 
Broening served as a member of the Baltimore City Council 1897–99 where he introduced legislation to establish the Electric Commission. He served in the Maryland House of Delegates 1902–04 where he served on the Judiciary Committee. He was elected Baltimore State's Attorney in 1911 and reelected to the position in 1915. He was selected as the Republican candidate for the Mayoralty contest in 1919 and defeated George Weems Williams, Democrat, on 3 March 1919. Broening left the Mayor's office in 1923, but returned to serve a second term from 1927 to 1931.

Fraternal societies 
Broening was a member of the Loyal Order of Moose, the Knights of Pythias, the Independent Order of Odd Fellows and the Benevolent and Protective Order of Elks.

Death and interment 
Broening died on 12 October 1953. He was buried at Woodlawn Cemetery.

References 

Mayors of Baltimore
Baltimore City Council members
University of Maryland Francis King Carey School of Law alumni
1870 births
1953 deaths